The Enid A. Haupt Glass Garden was built in 1958 as part of the Rusk Institute of Rehabilitation Medicine at New York University Medical Center.  It provides horticultural therapy for patients, but is also open to the public.  It is contained in a  greenhouse at 34th Street and First Avenue in New York City. The garden was a gift from Enid A. Haupt.

See also
 Enid A. Haupt Conservatory at the New York Botanical Garden
 Enid A. Haupt Garden at the Smithsonian Institution

External links
 Enid A. Haupt Glass Gardens - official site at Rusk Institute of Rehabilitation Medicine

Greenhouses in New York (state)
Buildings and structures in Manhattan
Kips Bay, Manhattan
Buildings and structures completed in 1958
1958 establishments in New York City